Jean-Esprit Isnard (1707–1781) was a French pipe organ builder.

Biography

Early life
Jean-Esprit Isnard was born in 1707. He was baptised in the Église Saint-Laurent in Bédarrides. He learned how to build pipe organs in Toulouse.

His brother, Joseph Isnard, was also a renowned pipe organ builder, as was his nephew Jean-Baptiste Isnard.

Career
He became a renowned builder of pipe organs. Many of his pipe organs can be found in Roman Catholic churches in Provence. In 1742, as a lay brother, he restored the pipe organ inside the Église Sainte-Marthe in Tarascon. The following year, in 1743, he built the pipe organ inside the Église de la Madeleine in Aix-en-Provence. He went on to build the pipe organs inside the Cathédrale Saint-Sauveur, also in Aix. In Marseille, he built the organ inside the Église Saint-Cannat in 1747. In, together with his brother Joseph Isnard, he built the pipe organ inside the Basilique Sainte-Marie-Madeleine in Saint-Maximin-la-Sainte-Baume from 1772 to 1774.

Additionally, he taught Jean-Pierre Cavaillé, the father of Dominique Cavaillé-Coll and grandfather of Aristide Cavaillé-Coll (1811-1899), how to build pipe organs.

Death
He died in 1781 in Tarascon, where he is buried.

Gallery

References

1707 births
1781 deaths
People from Vaucluse
People from Tarascon
French pipe organ builders